The Crescent River is a  tidal river in McIntosh County, Georgia, in the United States.  It forms in salt marshes east of the community of Bellville Point and flows southeast, ending at a river junction where the Mud River flows northeast into Sapelo Sound and Old Teakettle Creek flows south to Doboy Sound.

See also
List of rivers of Georgia

References 

USGS Hydrologic Unit Map - State of Georgia (1974)

Rivers of Georgia (U.S. state)
Rivers of McIntosh County, Georgia